Zentarō, Zentaro or Zentarou is a masculine Japanese given name.

Possible writings
Zentarō can be written using different combinations of kanji characters. Here are some examples:

The characters used for "taro" (太郎) literally means "thick (big) son" and usually used as a suffix to a masculine name, especially for the first son. The "zen" part of the name can use a variety of characters, each of which will change the meaning of the name ("善" for virtuous, "全" for all, "前" and so on).

善太郎, "virtuous, big son"
全太郎, "all, big son"
然太郎, "so, big son"
前太郎, "in front, big son"

Other combinations...

善太朗, "virtuous, thick, bright"
善多朗, "virtuous, many, bright"
善汰朗, "virtuous, excessive, bright"
全太朗, "all, thick, bright"
然太朗, "so, thick, bright"

The name can also be written in hiragana ぜんたろう or katakana ゼンタロウ.

Notable people with the name
, Japanese politician
, Japanese politician
, Japanese musician

Japanese masculine given names